Sławęcice may refer to the following places in Poland:
Sławęcice, Lower Silesian Voivodeship (south-west Poland)
Sławęcice, Świętokrzyskie Voivodeship (south-central Poland)
Sławęcice, West Pomeranian Voivodeship (north-west Poland)